Jean-Baptiste Annibal Aubert du Bayet (19 August 1759, Louisiana – 17 December 1797, Istanbul) was a French General and politician during the period of the French Revolution.

Aubert du Bayet was born in Baton-Rouge in the French American colony of Louisiana in 1759. Aubert du Bayet participated in the campaigns in America during the American Revolutionary War.

French revolution
Aubert du Bayet arrived in France at the beginning of the Revolution, but was initially hostile to revolutionary ideas. While in Metz, as a young Captain, he published an anti-Jewish pamphlet entitled Le cri du citoyen contre les Juifs. However, he soon saw that it could serve his ambitions. He became a member of the legislature in 1791. Aubert du Bayet was President of the French National Assembly (the "Legislative Assembly") from 8 July 1792 to 22 July 1792.

In 1793, he served as General of Brigade in the heroic defense of Mayence in 1793, when he finally had to surrender to the Prussian Army. He then seconded Hoche in Vendée in the fight against the Chouans in the War in the Vendée. He then became Minister of Defense of France ("Minister of War") from 3 November 1795 to 8 February 1796.

Ambassador to the Ottoman Empire

In 1796, General Aubert du Bayet was appointed as ambassador ("Minister of the Republic") to the Ottoman Empire. He was sent to the Ottoman court with artillery equipment, and French artillerymen and engineers to help with the development of the Ottoman arsenals and foundries. Infantry and cavalry officers were also to train the Spahis and Janissaries, but they were frustrated by the opposition of the Janissaries. Ironically, some of these troops, trained to Western methods, were successfully employed against the French troops of Napoleon a few years later under Sir Sydney Smith at the Siege of Saint-Jean d'Acre in 1799. Their behaviour delighted Selim III, and upon their return, they were named Nizam-gedittes or "New Regulars", but they were eventually slaughtered and dispersed by the Janissaries and conservative clerics and politicians, leading to the deposition of Selim III.

Aubert du Bayet died of fever in 1797 while in Constantinople. His widow returned to France and married to his long-time assistant Jean-François Carra de Saint-Cyr.

See also
 Franco-Ottoman alliance

Notes

External links

1759 births
1797 deaths
Politicians from Baton Rouge, Louisiana
Ambassadors of France to the Ottoman Empire
French generals
Members of the Legislative Assembly (France)
18th-century French diplomats
18th-century French military personnel
18th-century French politicians
Military leaders of the French Revolutionary Wars
French Republican military leaders of the French Revolutionary Wars
Republican military leaders of the War in the Vendée
French Ministers of War